The FC Basel 1904–05 season was their twelfth season in their existence. The club's chairman was Ernst-Alfred Thalmann, who was chairman for the second consecutive year. FC Basel played their home games in the Landhof in the Quarter Kleinbasel.

Overview 
Eugen Strauss was team captain and as captain he led the team trainings and was responsible for the line-ups. The team played just two pre-season friendlies, one in France against Mulhouse and one in Zürich against Grasshopper Club. The game against Mulhouse was won 8–1 the return match four months later in the Landhof was only drawn. The match against the Grasshoppers ended in a defeat. In the winter break the team travelled to Germany. They played against 1. FC Pforzheim on Christmas day and were defeated 7–3. On boxing day they played a game against Karlsruher FV and managed a draw. At the end of the season the team travelled again to Germany and were defeated 5–1 by Freiburger FC.

The seventh league championship, Swiss Serie A season 1904–05, was divided into three regional groups, east, central and west. Basel were allocated to the central group together with the Young Boys, FC Bern, Weissenbühl Bern and Old Boys Basel. This season was a sportingly very disappointing season for Basel. There were just two victories from eight games, both times against Weissenbühl Bern. The away game was won 9–2 and the return match 3–0. Weissenbühl Bern lost all their eight games and were relegated at the end of the season with a goal tally of five scored and 52 conceded. Basel's other six games all ended in defeats and they landed in second last position in the group table, scoring 18 and conceding 20 goals.

In the central group Young Boys Bern and the Old Boys Basel ended the season level on points as they did the year before and so a play-off match was arranged (see also foot note below). This time the Young Boys won the play-off with 2–1 and therefore they qualified for the finals. In the finals Grasshopper Club won both their matches and became Swiss champions for the third time in seven years.

Players 
Definite squad members

 

Probable squad members

Results 

Legend

Friendly matches

Pre-season

Winter break and end of season

Serie A

Central group matches

Central group league table 

NB: the match FC Basel - Young Boys Bern ended with the final score 3-4. Falsely, however, the result was originally reported as a 4-4 draw. Thus Old Boys would have finished in first position and were nominated as participants for the finals. After the mistake was noticed the W-D-L records and points totals in the league table were corrected and the necessary play-off match was arranged. However, the total goals remained without modification and consequently this leads to the fact that most older sources list the goal records for Young Boys and FC Basel as 35-11 and 19-20 respectively. Obviously this is arithmetically incorrect.

See also
 History of FC Basel
 List of FC Basel players
 List of FC Basel seasons

Notes

Footnotes 

1904–1905 season matches: FCB-Bern, OB-FCB, FCB-YB

References

Sources 
 Rotblau: Jahrbuch Saison 2014/2015. Publisher: FC Basel Marketing AG. 
 Die ersten 125 Jahre. Publisher: Josef Zindel im Friedrich Reinhardt Verlag, Basel. 
 Switzerland 1904-05 at RSSSF
(NB: Despite all efforts, the editors of these books and the authors in "Basler Fussballarchiv" have failed to be able to identify all the players, their date and place of birth or date and place of death, who played in the games during the early years of FC Basel. Most of the documentation is missing.)

External links
 FC Basel official site

FC Basel seasons
Basel